Neoheterophrictus amboli is a species of theraphosid spiders, which is found in India.

Etymology
The specific name of this species, amboli, comes from the type locality, Amboli.

Distinguishing features
N. amboli has a swelling in the sub-apical segment of the primary tibial apophysis, which abruptly terminates into a blunt tubercle, and has a long spine in the basal segments. On the secondary tibial apophysis, there is a stout, short spine.

References

Theraphosidae
Spiders of the Indian subcontinent
Spiders described in 2014